Old Venus is a "retro Venus science fiction"-themed anthology edited by George R. R. Martin and Gardner Dozois, that was published on March 3, 2015. All of the stories are set on the planet Venus as styled in the pre-space probe pulp magazines of the 1930s through the 1950s, in which it was considered a planet where humans could live.

Contents
The anthology includes 17 stories:
Introduction: Return to Venusport by Gardner Dozois
 "Frogheads" by Allen M. Steele
 "The Drowned Celestrial" by Lavie Tidhar
 "Planet of Fear" by Paul McAuley
 "Greeves and the Evening Star" by Matthew Hughes
 "A Planet Called Desire" by Gwyneth Jones
 "Living Hell" by Joe Haldeman
 "Bones of Air, Bones of Stone" by Stephen Leigh
 "Ruins" by Eleanor Arnason
 "The Tumbledowns of Cleopatra Abyss" by David Brin
 "By Frogsled and Lizardback to Outcast Venusian Lepers" by Garth Nix
 "The Sunset of Time" by Michael Cassutt
 "Pale Blue Memories" by Tobias S. Buckell
 "The Heart's Filthy Lesson" by Elizabeth Bear
 "The Wizard of the Trees" by Joe R. Lansdale
 "The Godstone of Venus" by Mike Resnick
 "Botanica Veneris: Thirteen Papercuts by Ida Countess Rathangan" by Ian McDonald

See also

 Venus in fiction

References

2015 anthologies
Gardner Dozois anthologies
Short stories set on Venus